José Luis Blanco Pajón (born 9 December 1956) is a Mexican politician from the Institutional Revolutionary Party. From 2006 to 2009 he served as Deputy of the LX Legislature of the Mexican Congress representing Yucatán.

References

1956 births
Living people
Politicians from Yucatán (state)
Institutional Revolutionary Party politicians
21st-century Mexican politicians
Deputies of the LX Legislature of Mexico
Members of the Chamber of Deputies (Mexico) for Yucatán